Florian Eisath (born 27 November 1984) is an Italian alpine ski racer.

Born in Bolzano, South Tyrol, he competed at the 2015 World Championships in Beaver Creek, USA, where he placed eighth in the

World Cup results

Season standings

Standings through 16 March 2018

Race podiums
 1 podium – (1 GS)

World Championships results

Olympic results

References

External links
 
 Florian Eisath at the Italian Winter Sports Federation (FISI) 

1984 births
Italian male alpine skiers
Living people
Sportspeople from Bolzano
Germanophone Italian people
Alpine skiers of Fiamme Gialle
Alpine skiers at the 2018 Winter Olympics
Olympic alpine skiers of Italy